At the Cavern is a live extended play 45 rpm record released in 1963 by The Big Three. It was released on Decca Records as DFE 8552 in mono and reached #6 in the UK EP charts in December 1963.

The liner notes are by Bob Wooler, the DJ at The Cavern Club in Liverpool where this live recording was recorded.

Track listing

Personnel
 Johnny Hutchinson – drums
 Johnny Gustafson – bass guitar
 Brian Griffiths – electric guitar
 Noel Walker – producer
 Terry Johnson – recording engineer

References

1963 EPs
The Big Three (English band) albums
Decca Records EPs
EPs by British artists
Pop rock EPs
Live EPs